The Black Prism is a fantasy novel by American author Brent Weeks. It is the first entry in the five-volume Lightbringer Series, and follows the 'Prism' Gavin Guile, the most powerful person in the world, as he fights against an uprising by a self-proclaimed king.

The book is described by the author as "a story of normal brothers—who happen to be in extraordinary circumstances", and touches on themes of conflict, resentment and love. It was first released in August 2010, and received mostly positive reviews.

Background 
The Black Prism is set in a pre-industrial fantasy milieu, albeit more advanced than most, with gunpowder weapons and widespread use of simple machines such as pulleys and gears.  The story takes place in The Seven Satrapies, 7 semi-autonomous countries, surrounding a large sea; each satrapy is ruled by a 'satrap'. Satrapies have considerable independence, but are under the loose control of a federalist central government; the Chromeria.  The Chromeria is also the seat of education and regulation for the color magic on which the series is based. The ruling council consists of seven "colors", who are essentially representatives from each satrapy, The White, and the Prism. The series is based around the magical principle of chromaturgy, in which light is harnessed to create 'Luxin'. The Prism, apart from being able to use magic of every color, must also be able to "split light", allowing them to use magic more efficiently than normal magicians. A normal magician is called a 'drafter', a drafter may draft until enough Luxin residue builds up in the drafter's eyes to break into the white of the eye, otherwise known as 'breaking the halo'. At this point they go mad and attempt to incorporate luxin into their own bodies. Creatures such as these are referred to as wights, and are terminated with extreme prejudice by the Chromeria, often via the Prism. A Prism represents the god Orholam (a name possibly related to 'hohlraum', a concept in the thermodynamics of radiation), who it is believed bestows magical power onto his chosen. A Prism's abilities, ceremonial authority, status and Chromeria-sponsored protection allow him a great deal of personal agency; however, he has the least official governing power in peacetime, this role falls to the 'white', a non-drafting ruler who decides on most of the Chromeria's political policy. Prisms typically die (or start to lose their colors) after their 7th, 14th, or 21st year of serving.

Only one person a generation is meant to be a 'full-spectrum light-splitter'; however, the two Guile brothers, Gavin and Dazen, demonstrate the same abilities. Gavin, the elder brother, was groomed to be Prism from a young age by Andross Guile, their father and spectrum color. After Dazen burns down the powerful White Oak family house with several women and children inside, he is sought by the Chromeria. The Chromeria's enemies quickly make common cause with him, and the resultant war is brief but bloody. At Sundered Rock, in the Satrapi of Tyrea, Gavin destroys his brother, causing Dazen's general Corvan Danavis to surrender. Tyrea was devastated, with almost all the men killed and its fertile farmland destroyed.

Plot 
Sixteen years after the war, the Prism receives a note from a woman claiming to be "Lina," instructing him to meet his now 15-year-old son across the world in Tyrea. He had not known of his son's existence until this point. This child was conceived while Gavin was betrothed to Karris White Oak, a member of his Black-guard, the most elite military force in the world. The White sends Karris to Garriston, Tyrea's capital, to spy on its Satrap's army. She gives Karris a note concerning Gavin's unfaithfulness, to be read after leaving the Chromeria. Gavin is sent somewhere else to keep the two separated, but instead chooses to bring Karris to Garriston himself before she can read the note, using a mode of transportation no one else even believes possible: magically-aided flight across the ocean. This allows them to enter Tyrea in hours, rather than the month or so expected otherwise.

As they draw closer, Karris sees smoke, and directs them to the former town of Rekton, which has been burned to the ground by Tyrean soldiers. They are just in time to save a teenager from being executed, killing several of the Satrap's personal bodyguards in the process. Gavin is then confronted by the irate Satrap himself, who calls himself King Garadul and his Satrapy a true independent nation. The town was burned on his order, as an example, due to their refusal to pay levies.

Tyreans are treated with little respect outside of Tyrea and have no true color on the spectrum. Garriston, the country's only port, is under a rotating occupation from the other Satrapies. King Garadul plans to continue the march of his largely conscripted army to Garriston and seize it, and from there, break the Chromeria's rule over the world.

The child is revealed to be Gavin's son, Kip. Following some debate, heated words, death threats and magic missiles, Kip and the Prism are allowed to leave together. However, the king takes a box from Kip which he claims was stolen from him. The box contains a white dagger given to Kip by his dying mother, who——through curses and abuse——made him promise to kill the man responsible.

Away from all this, Karris reads the note given to her by the White, and is angered by Gavin's betrayal, his lies about it when breaking their engagement, and the White's attempts to manipulate her into forgiving him. Because of this, she ultimately refuses Gavin's offer of assistance the rest of the way to Garriston, opting to explore Rekton while Gavin brings Kip back to the Chromeria. She meets Corvan Danavis, Kip's tutor and a former general of Dazen Guile's army. She is eventually captured by king Garadul, while Corvan continues to Garriston.

While Kip is entered into the Chromeria, shadowed by the Black-guard commander Ironfist, Gavin does a favor for Corvan's daughter Liv in exchange for her teaching Kip, as they are the only Tyreans in the Chromeria. He then enters a prison hidden deep in the Chromeria, containing his brother, whom he has secretly imprisoned in a cell in which nothing but blue luxin can be drafted. It is then revealed that the Prism is in fact Dazen, having stolen his older brother Gavin's identity. When Dazen became Gavin after the war, he chose to break off Gavin's previous betrothal to Karris despite his own feelings, truthfully 
denying any affairs. The prism interrogates his brother about both Kip and the dagger, which Gavin calls "your death coming." He then meets with his father, Andross Guile, to speak about Tyrea. When he mentions the box Garadul took from Kip, Andross immediately asks if it is "the white luxin," a supposedly mythical substance. His brother Gavin was aware of it as well, and Andross——not knowing Dazen isn't Gavin——assumes he knows what it is. Andross Guile orders his son to defeat Garadul's armies, but at all costs retrieve the dagger.

Kip, the Prism, Ironfist, and Liv leave for Tyrea to defend Garriston from Garadul's armies, sinking several pirates along the way. Corvan reaches Garriston at about this time, and agrees to lead the city's defense. Despite their real-world friendship, the Prism and Corvan must pretend to hate and distrust each other deeply. Liv questions her father about it, but he refuses to tell her the truth. She assumes the Prism is blackmailing him with her life, and silently vows to make him pay.

Liv and Kip run away to free Karris from Garadul's captivity. Ironfist leaves a few hours later, to see to their survival. Liv infiltrates successfully, while Kip is recognized and captured, though not before drafting sub-red for the first time. Karris, meanwhile, is taken to meet Lord Omnichrome, a color wight who heads Garadul's drafters. She recognizes him as her brother Koios, thought-killed by Dazen in overzealous self-defense before the war.

Ironfist helps Karris and Kip escape, and they both go after Garadul directly. Kip sees Lord Omnichrome give Zymun (a red drafter Kip knows from Rekton's burning) his mother's rosewood case, but Kip decides to help Karris. Playing on her disgust with the Prism and Chromeria, Omnichrome persuades Liv to join his cause in return for aiding Kip and Karris. Omnichrome intends for Garadul to die, so Corvan and Dazen try to save him. They are unsuccessful; Kip kills him in a rage before he can be stopped.

Kip, Karris and Corvan retreat to the docks, along with the Prism. Kip saves Ironfist's life before chasing the ship that's already left the dock. As Kip runs across the water, he sees someone stab the Prism from behind with the dagger, and tackles him off the ship. He retrieves the dagger and leaves the assassin for the sharks before escaping with the Prism's ship.

The Prism gives Kip the case, thinking the dagger lost. In it, Kip finds a note from his mother, telling him to kill "the man who raped me, Gavin Guile," and that she loves him. One of the clear diamond-like stones on the dagger's handle is now a sapphire-colored stone. At about this time, the real Gavin escapes from his blue luxin prison after nearly killing himself, only to find himself in an identical green luxin prison. The book ends as Dazen, who is Gavin to the world, discovers that he can no longer draft blue.

Chromaturgy 

Chromaturgy is the art of harnessing light and creating a substance from it, called Luxin. Luxin can take on many different shades from the visible spectrum and to either end of it (what we would call infrared and ultraviolet), and each color has its own unique properties.

People who use Luxin are called Drafters. Most Drafters can only cast a single color of Luxin and are known as 'Monochromes'. More powerful Drafters, known as 'Bichromes', can use two colors of Luxin, and people who can use three or more colors are known as 'Polychromes.' Polychromes are the most highly sought-after Drafters for any Satrapy's army. It would seem that in order to be considered a Drafter in a particular color, said Drafter must be able to Draft the solid, stable luxin of that color: Karris Whiteoak, who can Draft Green, Red and  most of Sub-Red, is only considered a Bichrome as she cannot draft the stable form of sub-red known as 'fire crystals.' In order to draft a color of Luxin, a Drafter must see the color somewhere in his or her surroundings. If the color is not available in their immediate surroundings, most Drafters get around this by wearing colored spectacles to filter their color from white (natural) light.

Luxin is deeply linked with the earthly flow of energies, and imbalance in the use of Luxin colors on a worldwide scale can result in natural disasters. In most cases Luxin flow is self-regulating, but occasionally it must be balanced by increased usage of certain colors of Luxin. Most often than not, this is accomplished by the Prism, a religious leader and political figurehead who rules over the Seven Satrapies as Emperor, although his political power is ceremonial at best. The Prism can draft every color of Luxin, and does not require colored glasses as he possesses the unique ability to split white light into its component colors.

Superchromat
Superchromats have extremely acute vision when it comes to colors. The inverse of those who are Subchromats (colorblindness), Superchromats can see the minute changes in shades between what most people would assume are the same color. This is extremely helpful for drafters, as different shades of Luxin have different properties, even within the same color, Yellow Luxin being a prime example. Half of all female Drafters are Superchromats, but hardly any male, with only 10 male Superchromats in the entire Chromeria.

Color Wight
Drafters can only draft so much in their lives. The more they draft, the more the luxin which courses through their bodies changes them. Not only does drafting damage the body, but it also affects the mind. As a drafter uses more Luxin, small amounts of it build up in the eye around the iris. This band of luxin is called the Halo, and it is by this that a drafter's life span is deduced. If a drafter uses too much luxin, the iris will fill with luxin, and any more drafting will cause them to "break the halo". This means that the band of luxin breaks and spreads into the whites of the eye. Once this happens, the drafter is considered a color wight, also known as a giist.

Becoming a color wight is the beginning of a descent into madness for the drafter. Happening gradually over time, the color wight will go under the influence of their drafting color's psychological influences; blue drafters will become hard and logical, greens will become wild, and reds will become creatures of rage. Color wights often commit their bodies to their luxin as well, coating or even replacing their body parts with sealed luxin. Color wights are considered insane and monsters, outcasts from society and are almost always hunted down. Those who worship Orholam also believe that becoming a color wight also damages your soul, though if this is something inherent in the act, defiance of the Pact, or because of the actions color wights take, is unclear.

If a drafter wishes to avoid becoming a giist, they must either stop drafting once their halos become full, or submit to Freeing. To most drafters, drafting isn't just a way of life, it is their life, and therefore most drafters elect to be Freed. The Freeing happens only once a year, on the holy day known as Sun Day. It is a ritual performed by the Prism, consisting of a farewell feast, a confession, and a ritual sacrifice of the drafter's life.

Luxin 

The magic of the Lightbringer Series as described in the author's blog: "When a candle burns, a physical substance (wax) is transformed into light. Chromaturgy in The Black Prism  is the inverse: A drafter transforms light into a physical substance (luxin). Each different color of luxin has its own strength, weight, and even smell: blue luxin is hard, red is gooey, yellow is liquid, etc. But even as drafters change the world, the luxin changes them too, physically, mentally, and emotionally. The color change of a drafter's eyes is only the beginning…"

Superviolet
Made of wavelengths shorter than most human eyes can see, superviolet luxin is invisible except to superviolet drafters—and those only when they concentrate. Solid, but not as strong as blue or green, superviolet is the subtlest luxin. Used for cryptography, creating invisible walls and traps, and marking targets on the battlefield, superviolets tend to have a removed outlook. They appreciate irony and sarcasm and are sometimes cold.

Blue 
Blue Luxin is hard, strong, and smooth. It can be used in anything from the creation of large structures to armor or bladed weapons or projectiles. The deepest blue is Violet. Blues are orderly, inquisitive, and unfailingly rational. Structure, rules, and hierarchy are important to blues.

Green
Green Luxin is springy and flexible. The uses are as varied as the drafter is creative: from furniture to projectiles to shields to the throwing arms of war engines. Greens are wild and free. They don't so much disrespect authority as not even recognize it.

Yellow
Yellow Luxin is most often a liquid that releases its energy back into light quickly, allowing its use as a torch or a trigger to ignite flammable materials or explosives. Yellow nourishes other luxins, extending the durability of luxin structures or tools. Like water turning to ice, when yellow is drafted perfectly, it loses its liquidity and becomes the hardest luxin of all. Yellows tend to be clear thinkers, intellect and emotion in perfect balance.

Orange
Orange luxin is slick, lubricative, and heavy. It is often used in conjunction with machines and traps. Oranges are often artists, brilliant in understanding other people's emotions and motivations. Some use this to defy or exceed expectations. Others become master manipulators. Orange drafters are also able to create hexes, altering others emotions.

Red
Red luxin is sticky, gooey, and extremely flammable. Reds often work with sub-reds or with mundane tools to make bombs. Their skills are used to catastrophic effect in war. Reds are quick tempered, impulsive, lusty, and love destruction.

Sub-Red
By dilating their eyes fully, sub-red drafters can see heat, allowing them to see (to an extent) in the dark. They can draft the heat from their surroundings to survive intense heat and create flame crystals, which turn into fire when exposed to air. Sub-reds are passionate in all ways, the most purely emotional of all the drafters.

Paryl
By dilating the pupils so far that the whites of the eyes disappear drafters can see into paryl. Paryl resembles millimeter waves on the electromagnetic spectrum just as Sub Red resembles infrared. Paryl drafters have the ability to see through objects unless they are made of metal as paryl can pass through matter to a certain depth. Paryl is most commonly drafted in a gas, or a 'paryl torch', however it is possible to create a liquid or even a solid. In keeping with the emotional spectrum paryl drafters have a very strong feeling of empathy towards others when using Paryl, in some individuals this can mean that they can even feel the individual colors in the spectrum (when the light is in direct contact with their skin).

White
White luxin is a  mythical luxin which many have attempted to draft, though only two people are known to have drafted it, the maker of the Blinding Knife(Unknown) and the Prism Gavin(Dazen in disguise) Guile. Gavin(Dazen) drafted white luxin in the battle for Garriston while attempting to defend the gap in the Brightwater Wall where the gate should have been. He promptly blacks out and Commander Ironfist rescues him and picks up the white luxin(but that is not written in the story). Commander Ironfist later presents the white luxin to the White, Orea Pullawr, stating that the Prism had drafted it during the battle. Its qualities and the qualities of those who draft it are unknown.

Black
Black luxin is madness in luxin form, it has its own will and causes soul death in those who draft it. Dead black luxin is also known as Obsidian which is also known as Hellstone. it has been suggested that black luxin can devour other luxins in a way that's more effective than obsidian however whether this applies to white luxin is unknown. Dazen Guile and now, revealed in The Blood Mirror, the White King, are the only known drafters of Black Luxin, however there have clearly been previous drafters due to the presence of Hellstone and Obsidian. Dazen drafts Black Luxin after his first Sun Day as the Prism.

Chi
Nothing is currently known about "Chi" luxin, but it is mentioned in the third book by a member of the Order of the Broken Eye. In The Blood Mirror, chi is described as being past ultraviolet on the spectrum, like paryl is just past sub-red. Likewise chi can be drafted to balance paryl. The use of chi isn't well explored within the 4th book for its functional purpose yet, although it is shown to reveal bones and metal. Thus it is heavily implied that Chi (the Greek letter X) is the equivalent of X-rays, like paryl is the equivalent of terahertz radiation.
Potentially, though unconfirmed, it causes tumors to grow in the user. In a Card Flashback experienced by Kip, while living a Chi user's memory she speaks of it as "foul" and feeling unable to touch the stuff, saying she "could practically feel the tumors growing already"

Pre-publication 
On April 30, 2010 the first three chapters of the book were released as a preview on the Orbit Book website.

Critical reception 
The book debuted at #23 on The New York Times Best Seller list.

The websites Grasping For The Wind, Fantasy Faction and King of the Nerds all gave the book a positive review. Publishers Weekly called The Black Prism a "complicated fantasy" that "moves into familiar territory."

In 2011, The Black Prism was a finalist for the David Gemmell Legend Award for best fantasy novel.

In 2013, The Blinding Knife won the David Gemmell Legend Award for best fantasy novel.

References 

American fantasy novels
Novels by Brent Weeks
2010 American novels
Orbit Books books